Serenades of Love was Bobby Vinton's twenty-eighth studio album and his fourth for ABC Records. It was released in 1976. Two singles came from the album: "Save Your Kisses for Me" and "Moonlight Serenade".

Track listing
Side 1
 "Save Your Kisses for Me" (Tony Hiller, Lee Sheriden, Martin Lee) – 3:18
 "Lady of the House (Sandra)" (Enoch Anderson, Barry Manilow) – 3:47
 "Paloma Blanca" (Hans Bouwens) – 3:17
 "Let Me Down Easy" (M. James) – 2:53
 "I Cross My Fingers" (Walter Kent, William Farrer) – 2:18
 "Moonlight Serenade" (Mitchell Parish, Glenn Miller) – 3:22
Side 2
 Waltz Medley: "Tales from Vienna Woods"/"Blue Skirt Waltz"/"You Are My One True Love" (Johann Strauss, Vaclav Blaha, Mitchell Parish, Bob Kames, R. Kaiser) – 3:39
 "Jenny" (E. Shuman, P. Morelli) – 4:27
 "Elise" (Grascolos, Linzer) – 2:57
 "Penny" (S. Davis, G. Lane) – 3:18
 "Lemondrops, Lollipops and Sunbeams" (From the 20th Century Fox Film The Duchess and the Dirtwater Fox) (Sammy Cahn, Melvin Frank, Charles Fox) – 3:31
 "Another Without You Day" (Roger Cook, Roger Greenaway, Stephen Jameson, Matthew Doctors) – 2:52

Album credits
Produced by Bob Morgan
Mastering engineering by Mike Reese
Art direction by Wilkes and Klasky
Photography by Hans Albers
Lettering by John Cabalka
Arranger for "Save Your Kisses for Me", "Paloma Blanca", "Jenny" and "Elise": Al Capps
Arranger for "Lady of the House (Sandra)": Mike Melvoin
Arrangers for "Let Me Down Easy": Bobby Vinton, Bob Morgan
Arranger for "I Cross My Fingers": Ernie Freeman
Arranger for "Moonlight Serenade", "Penny" and "Another Without You Day": Joe Reisman
Arrangers for "Waltz Medley": Bobby Vinton, Ernie Freeman
Arranger for "Lemondrops, Lollipops and Sunbeams": Charles Fox
Engineer for "Save Your Kisses for Me": Ron Malo
Engineer for "Lady of the House (Sandra)", "Jenny", "Elise" and "Another Without You Day": Tom Vicari
Engineer for "Paloma Blanca": John Mills
Engineers for "Let Me Down Easy": Lou Bradley, Tom Vicari
Engineers for "I Cross My Fingers": Barry Keen, Mike Lietz
Engineers for "Moonlight Serenade": John Mills, Armin Steiner
Engineer for "Waltz Medley" and "Lemondrops, Lollipops and Sunbeams": Armin Steiner
Engineers for "Penny": Tom Vicari, Mike Lietz
String arranger for "Moonlight Serenade": H. B. Barnum

1976 albums
ABC Records albums
Bobby Vinton albums